The 2007–08 season was Hereford United's 27th season in the Football League and ended in the club winning promotion to League One, the third tier of English football, for the first time in 30 years.

It was Hereford's second season back in the Football League after nine seasons spent in the Conference. The previous season had seen Hereford finish 16th after a poor run of form in the final stages of the season. On the strength of this they were predicted to battle against relegation this season by most media sources. Only one member of the 2007-08 squad was purchased for a transfer fee, Ben Smith who was signed from Weymouth for £20,000 in January 2007.

On 26 April 2008 they secured 3rd place and promotion to League One.

League Two

(*) Gary Hooper got the final touch to the first goal although all major news sources credit the goal to Simon Johnson.

FA Cup

League Cup

Football League Trophy

(Hereford received a bye to the Second Round)

Herefordshire Senior Cup

Squad statistics

Transfers

In

Out

Loan in

Loan out

References

Hereford United F.C. seasons
Hereford United